Ed Setrakian (born October 1, 1928 in Anawalt, West Virginia) is an American actor of film and television. Setrakian is known for appearing in the films Tough Guys Don't Dance and Zodiac and the television programs  The Sopranos (in the episode Where's Johnny?) and Person of Interest (in two episodes as Grifoni). Setrakian has also played four different roles in the Law & Order franchise.

Filmography

References

External links
 
 

1928 births
20th-century American male actors
21st-century American male actors
American male film actors
American male television actors
Male actors from West Virginia
People from Anawalt, West Virginia
Living people
St. Francis College people